Cameron Knowles (born 11 October 1982 in Auckland) is a New Zealand football coach and former player who is currently the head coach of MLS Next Pro side Minnesota United 2.

Playing career

College and Amateur
Knowles played college soccer for the University of Akron, captaining the team his senior year.  Knowles anchored an Akron defence that allowed only three goals in league play and recorded 13 shutouts in 2004. Knowles, a two-time All-Mid-American Conference (MAC) first-team selection led Akron to two MAC titles in 2002 and 2004 and helped Akron make four consecutive NCAA tournament appearances. He was selected to the All-MAC second team his freshman and sophomore seasons and voted Akron's Newcomer of the Year in 2001.  In addition, Knowles was a College Soccer News All-Freshman Team honourable mention. A testament to his durability, Knowles played in 49 straight games during his career at Akron.

Knowles also played in the USL Premier Development League for Chicago Fire Premier making 14 appearances and scoring two goals in league play.  In addition, Knowles scored 3 goals during the Fire's 2004 Lamar Hunt U.S. Open Cup campaign.

Professional
Knowles was drafted by Real Salt Lake of Major League Soccer in the fourth round of the 2005 MLS Supplemental Draft, becoming the first Akron Zip to be drafted by a Major League Soccer team. He made his professional debut on 22 June 2007 against the Los Angeles Galaxy and totalled 346 minutes in four matches his rookie season in MLS, but did not make an appearance at all in 2006 and was released at the end of the year.

Knowles signed with the Portland Timbers of the USL First Division in 2007, and played in all 28 regular-season matches in his debut season for the team, scoring two goals and being named as one of three finalists for the USL First Division Defender of the Year award. He started 29 of 30 matches for the Timbers in 2008 was named to the USL First Division All-League second team.

In August 2009 Knowles sustained a serious leg injury in Montreal that sidelined him for the rest of the season and part of 2010. Knowles was picked up on 26 July 2011, by the Montreal Impact.  Knowles made 8 appearances for the Impact before retiring at the end of 2011.  He was released by Montreal on 12 October 2011.

International
Knowles was selected in the New Zealand under 17 squad for the FIFA World Championships but did not participate in the tournament has he suffered a broken leg three weeks prior to the opening match.

Coaching career
On 26 January 2012, the Portland Timbers of Major League Soccer announced the addition of Knowles to the coaching staff as an assistant under Head Coach John Spencer.

Honors

Portland Timbers
USL First Division Commissioner's Cup (1): 2009

References

External links
 Portland Timbers bio

1982 births
Living people
Akron Zips men's soccer players
Chicago Fire U-23 players
Real Salt Lake players
Portland Timbers (2001–2010) players
Montreal Impact (1992–2011) players
Expatriate soccer players in Canada
Expatriate soccer players in the United States
Association football defenders
New Zealand expatriate association footballers
New Zealand association footballers
Association footballers from Auckland
USL League Two players
Major League Soccer players
USL First Division players
USSF Division 2 Professional League players
North American Soccer League players
Real Salt Lake draft picks
Portland Timbers non-playing staff
Portland Timbers 2 coaches
New Zealand expatriate sportspeople in the United States
New Zealand association football coaches